Muratt Atik is a French-Turkish-English speaking actor and producer.
Atik has been nominated for several awards as a French personality and in 2008 won personality of the year at the Trophées de la Nuit also in 2014 he won outstanding contribution to Parisian Entertainment at the Monaco Globes de Crystal.
Trained professionally at the Conservatoire National d'Art Dramatique. He was first a theatre actor then moved to cinema and television.
He is known for his roles as Cengizhan in EVE DÖNÜS (2015 - ATVTurkey) and also as Captain Ahmet in DARBE (2014). He also appeared as a guest as Guvercin Ali in KERTENKELE (2014 ATVTurkey).
He played as Le Turc in the French movie Paris Countdown (2013) by Edgar MARIE, as Aslan in Borderline by Olivier MARCHAL (2014) and as Milo in French TV Show BRAQUO by O. MARCHAL & Frédéric Schoendoerffer (2009).

Muratt Atik works between Turkey (Istanbul) and France (Paris). He is also a successful businessman and French TV personality.

Early life 

Muratt Atik was born 18 November in Bursa, Turkey but now lives in Paris, France with his wife and two children. He is the oldest child in his family. He studied at the Conservatoire National d’Art Dramatique and in Studio 34 School of Cinema, workshops with Julien Bertheau for theatre and  Patricia Sterling for cinema.

Career

Acting
Muratt Atik started his career as a theatre actor starring in numerous theatre productions : La Visite - Alain BERTHEAU, Danton et Robespierre - Pierre LEFEVRE, Le Barbier de Séville - Pierre LEFEVRE, Les Émigrés - Philippe AMBLARD, Les Aveux les plus Doux - Alain BERTHEAU, Les Aveux les plus Fous - Philippe AMBLARD.
His most recent productions include Cabaret Canaille - Nicolas BRIANCON  and Festival d’Anjou with Clara MORGANE and Nicolas BRIANCON.

Muratt Atik is currently playing Cengizhan in Turkish TV show EVE DÖNÜS on ATVTurkey.

Producing 

Muratt Atik has also owned with his wife for the last ten years the famous cabaret Pink Paradise created by Cathy and David Guetta
He has also released a book about his cabaret ( Strip-Tease, Editions de La Martinière) and produced 13 episodes of the docu-serie Danse Privée for French network Planet.
Muratt Atik produced the Pink Paradise Revue a live show released on French networks Paris Premiere and Fashion TV. He also produced the show BurlesQ in 2013, a burlesque cabaret revue.
He has appeared in various TV shows in France such as Stars et Fortunes on M6, Le Droit de Savoir TF1,  Canal + Les Grandes Vacances, Toutaz on France 4, La Folie Paradise on Paris Première, Tellement People on NRJ 12 and Tellement Vrai on NRJ Paris.

Personal life 

Muratt Atik has been married for the last 14 years to wife and business partner Joanna Atik. They have two children and they currently reside in Paris, France.

Acting Works 
CINEMA & TV SHOWS

THEATRE

References

21st-century Turkish male actors
French male film actors
Turkish male stage actors
21st-century French male actors
Turkish male film actors
Turkish male television actors
French male television actors
People from Bursa
Living people
Year of birth missing (living people)